The Phil Esposito Trophy was awarded annually by the Central Hockey League (CHL) to the league's leading scorer during the regular season.

Named in honour of Phil Esposito commencing with 1979–80 CHL season, the Hall of Famer played 43 games in the CHL during the 1963–64 season, to collect 26 goals 54 points with the St. Louis Braves, before moving into the National Hockey League with the Chicago Black Hawks.

List of winners

References

External links
Phil Esposito Trophy winners

Central Professional Hockey League trophies and awards